Bukola Folayan (born 18 February 1979), professionally known as Bouqui or B.O.U.Q.U.I is a Nigerian-American rapper, singer, songwriter, on-air personality, fashion designer and author. Her debut, self-titled album, B.O.U.Q.U.I earned her the Award for Best Female Act at the 2007 Award for Music Excellence in Nigeria (AMEN), as well as nominations for Revelation of the Year and Best Rap Album at The Headies 2007. Her video for the single Take You Away, won the award for Best Mainstream Video at the 2010 Nigerian Music Video Awards (NMVA).

Career

Early life and career beginnings
Bouqui was born in Wesley Guild, Ilesha, Osun state to Oba Ololade Folayan I, her father, a traditional ruler and professor of biochemistry  and her mother Esther Olufemi, a professional teacher. She grew up alongside her five siblings at the Obafemi Awolowo University staff quarters. While at university, Bouqui founded an all-girl group, G-vibes.

Solo career and B.O.U.Q.U.I
She began her solo career in 1999, taking on the moniker, Bouqui, which is an acronym for, "Born Once More Unto A Quickened And Unparalleled Image". She gained notoriety with the release of the singles, Molejo, Vanity and Get it Started off her debut 2007 album, B.O.U.Q.U.I, which featured on charts in the United Kingdom; with the single, Get it Started debuting at number one on the backyard beats segment of the World Chart Show, hosted by PJ Butta, which was the first by a Nigerian based artiste. 

The album, B.O.U.Q.U.I was nominated for Best Rap Album at The Headies 2007, as well as Hip Hop World Revelation of the Year. It also won her the award for Best Female Act at the AMEN Awards, also in 2007. Bouqui was featured on DJ Jimmy Jatt's track Too Much, which also featured Sasha P, Blaise and Kemistry.

Following her album release, Bouqui embarked on a 15 city tour of the United Kingdom.

Redefinition
Ahead of the release of her sophomore album, Redefinition, in 2009, Bouqui released the singles, Mo ri le and Take You Away featuring Four Kornerz to critical acclaim, winning the award for Best Mainstream Video at the 2010 Nigerian Music Video Awards (NMVA) for the video for Take You Away. The Redefinition Album was produced, mixed and mastered in the UK by JJC Skillz and Mix Master Jay for her record label, Bouqui's Place Entertainment.

Bouqui embarked on the Redefinition Tour, touring cities in the United States and Canada. She also organized the Redefinition Campus Storm, which took her to various university campuses in Nigeria, including her alma mater, Obafemi Awolowo University, where  her concert had a recorded attendance of 15,000.

Bouqui won the awards for Best Female Act and Best Video at the Women in Entertainment and Arts Awards in the UK in 2009.

2011 to present: Double Album and other releases
In November 2011, Bouqui released Igbeyinloju, a remake of King Sunny Adé's hit song of the same title from the 1980s, produced by Jerry Metz. 

In February 2013, Bouqui featured American rapper, Da' T.R.U.T.H. on her single, Celebrate, which was ranked #22 on the Top Gospel Songs on 2013. She collaborated with him on his Love, Hope and War Tour across the United States, and riding on the platform set up by Bouqui's Redefinition Campus Storm, the Love, Hope and War Tour was brought to Nigerian campuses, drawing performances from several notable gospel artistes like, Sammie Okposo, Nikki Laoye, Tim Godfrey and Eben.

In March 2013, Bouqui announced in a joint press release by her record label, Bouqui's Place Entertainment and US-based record label Xist Music, that she had been signed as the first African artiste and first female act to Xist Music. Xist Music, which also had Grammy nominated rapper, Da' T.R.U.T.H. on its books also announced that Bouqui would head, Xist Africa, which would be based in Nigeria, and that she would be releasing a double album under the Xist Music imprint tagged Marks of a General and Eve Of Independence.

Bouqui relocated to the United States in February 2014 and in June 2015, she released the single Unstoppable produced by US-based producer, Dapo Torimiro. In collaboration with Dapo Torimiro, she organized the Unstoppable Rap Competition for aspiring musicians. Gr8man won the competition, with Limoblaze and Angeloh, the 2nd and 1st runners up respectively. Bouqui would feature Angeloh in her 2018 single, King David.

In 2017, Bouqui would again collaborate with Dapo Torimiro, to produce the single, Underground, which released ahead of her fifth studio album, titled, Bouqui Unstoppable. The album was released in November 2018 with an album listening party in Lagos, Nigeria. All tracks in the EP featured Angeloh and were produced by 'Q' and mixed & mastered by Mix Master Jay.

Other endeavors
In March 2019, Bouqui was ordained as a Reverend in the United States and is presently the youth pastor of Victory Christian Fellowship in Delaware.

In 2020, during the COVID-19 lockdown, Bouqui began hosting an Instagram Live session titled, Bouqui's Place, where she has interviewed notable Nigerian celebrities including MI Abaga, Waje, Stella Damasus, Ruggedman and more.

Bouqui published her first book in April 2022, titled My Naked Parts.

In May 2022, she became the first notable African rapper to obtain an academic doctorate degree, when she graduated with a PhD in Marketing, Advertising and Faith-based Initiative from HBI University, Connecticut.

Awards and recognition

Discography
Studio albums
B.O.U.Q.U.I (2007)
Redefinition (2009)
Marks of a General and Eve Of Independence (2013)
Bouqui Unstoppable (2018)

Notable singles
Molejo (2007)
Vanity (2007); produced by ID Cabasa
Mo ri le (2009)
Take You Away (2009) featuring Four Kornerz
Sokutuyoyo (2012) featuring Henrisoul and produced by Sam Klef

As a featured artiste
Too Much by DJ Jimmy Jatt featuring Bouqui, Blaise, Sasha P and Kemistry
Alheri (Remix) by Solomon Lange featuring Bouqui

Videography

References 

1979 births
Nigerian women rappers
Living people
21st-century Nigerian musicians
Nigerian hip hop singers
21st-century women musicians
Women hip hop singers